Humberstone Road station was a station to the north of Leicester, England, opened in 1875 and closed in 1968.

The line was originally opened by the Midland Counties Railway, which joined the North Midland Railway and the Birmingham and Derby Junction Railway to form the Midland Railway which opened Humberstone Road Station.

The small village of Humberstone, situated some two miles further north-eastwards was noted for its alabaster mine but, Humberstone Road station alongside what is now the A47, served the northern side of Leicester which was rapidly expanding. Although the line is still a major route (the present-day Midland Main Line), there is now very little trace of the station.

The station building lay derelict for many years after being taken out of service as a passenger station. As a grade two listed building it had to be preserved, but British Rail did not have sufficient funds for such an operation. A buyer was looked for. Eventually it was sold to Leicestershire County Council for £1 plus VAT (15p at the time!). It was moved brick by brick to its new home at Shenton Station, on the Battlefield Line Railway, where it would serve as an information point for Bosworth Battlefield and a southern terminus building for the railway. 

The next station northwards was at Syston between Leicester and Loughborough. A short distance away was the similarly named Humberstone railway station, which was on the Great Northern Railway's Leicester branch.

References

External links
http://www.disused-stations.org.uk/
 

Transport in Leicester
Former Midland Railway stations
Disused railway stations in Leicestershire
Railway stations in Great Britain opened in 1875
Railway stations in Great Britain closed in 1968
Beeching closures in England